Flaugergues may refer to:

 Honoré Flaugergues (1755–1830/5), French astronomer
 Pierre-François Flaugergues (1767–1836), French lawyer
 Flaugergues (crater), a crater on the Moon
 Château de Flaugergues, a castle near Montpellier, Languedoc-Roussillon, France